Patrick James Gallagher (June 28, 1915 – October 27, 1991) was an American politician in the state of Washington. He served in the Washington House of Representatives from 1961 to 1991.

References

1991 deaths
1915 births
Democratic Party members of the Washington House of Representatives
20th-century American politicians